Linear scheduling method (LSM) is a graphical scheduling method focusing on continuous resource utilization in repetitive activities.

Application
LSM is used mainly in the construction industry to schedule resources in repetitive activities commonly found in highway, pipeline, high-rise building and rail construction projects. These projects are called repetitive or linear projects. The main advantages of LSM over critical path method (CPM) is its underlying idea of keeping resources continuously at work. In other words, it schedules activities in such a way that:

 resource utilization is maximized;
 interruption in on-going process is minimized, including hiring-and-firing; and
 the effect of the learning curve phenomenon is maximized

Alternative names

According to, specific names for the linear scheduling method have been adopted, such as:
Location-based scheduling (the preferred term in the book)
Harmonograms
Line-of-balance
Flowline or flow line
Repetitive scheduling method
Vertical production method
Time-location matrix model
Time space scheduling method
Disturbance scheduling
Horizontal and vertical logic scheduling for multistory projects
Horizontal and vertical scheduling
Multiple repetitive construction process
Representing construction
Linear scheduling
Time versus distance diagrams (T-D charts)
Time chainage 
Linear balance charts
Velocity diagrams

See also
List of project management software
List of project management topics
Project management
Project planning
Sequence step algorithm
Time distance diagram
Work breakdown structure

References

Further reading
 James Wonneberg and Ron Drake (2016) Linear Scheduling 101
Robert B. Harris and Photios G. Ioannou Repetitive Scheduling Method
 David W. Johnston Linear Scheduling Method for Highway Construction
 Frank Harris and Ronald McCaffer Modern Construction Management 6th Ed UK: Blackwell Publishing

Network theory
Project management techniques
Business terms
Production planning
Scheduling algorithms